Louis Urbain Lefebvre de Caumartin (1653-1720) was a French nobleman. He held the offices of member of the Parliament of Paris, and later Intendant des finances and counsellor of state.

1653 births
1720 deaths